The 2011 season of the Kyrgyz Women's League started on 1 May 2011 in Kant. The championship will be held as a triple round-robin tournament. Each round stretches only over five days, where teams play against each other, one match at a day in a single city. So the season will commence after the third matchweek.

The second matchweek was held from 21 to 25 August 2011 in Talas. The third matchday was held in October in Bishkek.

Sdyushorsi from Bishkek won the championship due to a better goal difference over Adbish-Ata from Kant.

Final league standings

The league's top scorer award was given to Ramin Choi with 21 goals for Sdyushorsi (Bishkek).

References

 
Kyrgyzstan
women